RPN Kampong Rimba or Kampong Rimba National Housing Scheme is a public housing area in Brunei-Muara District, Brunei, on the northern outskirts of the capital Bandar Seri Begawan. The total population was 15,658 in 2016. It is part of Mukim Gadong 'A', a mukim in Brunei-Muara District.

Administration 
For administrative purposes the area has since been divided into, and established as, five village subdivisions:

All of them are villages under Mukim Gadong 'A'.

Education 
There are two primary and two secondary schools in the public housing area and they are all government schools. The schools include:

 Secondary: Rimba Secondary School and Rimba II Secondary School
 Primary: Rimba I Primary School and Rimba II Primary School

The schools provide the public education for the pupils and students residing in the public housing area as well as the neighbouring Rimba settlement.

A new secondary school is also currently built in the area which will cater for the Islamic religious education of the Arabic stream.

See also 
 STKRJ Kampong Rimba
 Lambak Kanan

Notes

References 

Rimba, RPN